Saxondale Hospital was a psychiatric hospital near Radcliffe-on-Trent in Nottinghamshire, built to replace the Sneinton Asylum in Nottingham.

History

The foundation stone was laid on 25 July 1899 by Lady Belper, wife of the chairman of Nottinghamshire County Council. The new building – designed by architect Edgar Purnell Hooley, better known as the inventor of Tarmac – was two stories high, cost £147,000 and had accommodation for 452 patients (226 of each sex). The  surrounding the hospital cost £6800. It was officially opened as the Radcliffe Asylum by Lady Elinor Denison on 24 July 1902. In 1913 extensions were made for 148 patients, which cost £29,833. It was used as a military hospital in the later stages of the First World War, from August 1918 to October 1919, to care for shell shocked soldiers. 

The hospital underwent a strike and occupation in April 1922, when the staff members of the National Asylum Workers' Union were resisting a reduction in wages. In 1932, two further blocks were erected, each to accommodate 50 female patients. It became known as Saxondale Hospital in 1947 and joined the National Health Service in 1948. Further villas were built in the grounds in the 1950s and 1960s.

A woman alleged that Jimmy Savile lifted her skirt when she was at a disco at the hospital and then aged 14. She was a local resident rather than a patient. Savile had a fundraising association with Saxondale Hospital from 1972 to the early 1980s. The official report on the incident stated, "There was no reason to doubt that she gave an honest and truthful account of the incident as she recalled it."

Closure
The hospital closed in 1987 and was partly demolished before the site was redeveloped. It is now a housing area known as Upper Saxondale.

References

Hospital buildings completed in 1902
Defunct hospitals in England
Radcliffe on Trent